Nigel Tufnel is a fictional character in the 1984 mockumentary film This Is Spinal Tap. In the film, he is the lead guitarist of the rock band Spinal Tap. He was played by actor Christopher Guest.

Character biography
Nigel Tufnel was born in Squatney, East London on 5 February 1948. He was given his first guitar, a Sunburst "Rhythm King", by his father at age six. His life changed when he met David St. Hubbins (Michael McKean) who lived next door. They began jamming together in a toolshed in David's garden, influenced by (fictional) early blues artists like Honkin' Bubba Fulton, Little Sassy Francis and particularly Big Little Daddy Coleman, a deaf guitar player, and wrote their first song, "(Cry) All the Way Home." Before long they had formed their first band, The Thamesmen.

Tufnel's hobbies include collecting guitars; particularly noteworthy is his Sea Foam Green six-string Fender Bass VI with the price tag still attached, which he has kept in mint condition by not allowing it to be played, touched, pointed at, looked at, or talked about. He also has a Gibson Les Paul 1959 model, whose acoustic properties and carved flame-maple top he praises. He also plays mandolin and piano, and does backing vocals. In the film he is writing a classical piece which he feels combines the musical characteristics of both Mozart and Bach (a "Mach piece") in D minor, which he claims is the "saddest of all keys". The piece is provisionally titled "Lick My Love Pump'".

Tufnel has a great love for Gumby, carrying figurines of Gumby and Pokey in his shirt pocket and wearing Gumby shirts frequently. He is also a self-proclaimed "fish nut," liking cod and canned tuna because they have "no bones." Tufnel sits on the editorial board of his preferred in-flight periodical, Car and Driver. His favorite cookies are Oreos, but without the filling. A rider in his contract requires a large plate of Oreo halves, without frosting. Onstage he wears glam rock-inspired makeup and usually plays a Gibson Les Paul. He is almost always seen chewing gum.

Tufnel has stated that if he was not in the music industry he would like to either enter the field of haberdashery or become a surgeon.

Tufnel's work outside Spinal Tap includes his appearance on the 1979 album Lenny & Squiggy present Lenny and the Squigtones, released on Casablanca Records four years before Spinal Tap. Lenny and Squiggy were fictional characters on the TV series Laverne & Shirley, and Lenny, like Spinal Tap's David St. Hubbins, was played by Michael McKean.

2011 Nigel Tufnel Day

Tufnel is especially noted for his amplifier which has numbering going "up to eleven", which he believes makes it louder than amplifiers that only go up to ten ("It's one louder"). When he is asked why the ten setting is not simply set to be louder, Nigel pauses, clearly confused, before responding, "These go to eleven."

In the run-up to 2011 Spinal Tap fans created a movement to make 11/11/11 "Nigel Tufnel Day." The movement was organised by The Nigel Tufnel Day Appreciation Society and Quilting Bee in Favor of Declaring & Observing 11 November 2011 as Nigel Tufnel Day (in Recognition of Its Maximum Elevenness). The theme of Nigel Tufnel Day was to take whatever you are doing on that day and "turn it up to 11".

Soloing techniques
 Using a violin (as opposed to a violin bow, as made famous by Jimmy Page) to play his guitar
 Playing a second guitar with his foot
 Classical music inspired solos
 Playing another guitar from a distance using horseshoes (as in The Return of Spinal Tap)

References

External links
 
 The Ultimate Spinal Tap Discography – an illustrated guide to Tap's albums (both real and imagined)

Fictional rock musicians
Film characters introduced in 1984
Fictional people from London
Fictional guitarists
Spinal Tap (band) members
Male characters in film
Comedy film characters